Les Plans is the name or part of the name of several communes in France:

 Les Plans, in the Gard department
 Les Plans, in the Hérault department

oc:Lo Pin (Gard)